William Luther Moore (March 31, 1851 – November 14, 1926) was an American politician who twice served as a member of the Virginia House of Delegates, representing Tazewell County.

References

External links
 
 

1851 births
1926 deaths
Republican Party members of the Virginia House of Delegates
People from Tazewell, Virginia